Kübra Kegan (born July 18, 1995 in Ankara, Turkey) is a Turkish volleyball player. Kegan is a member of the Turkey women's youth national volleyball team, and wears number 11.

Clubs
  Tarımspor Ankara (2008-2009)
  TVF Sport High School (2009-2011)
  MKE Ankaragücü (2011-2012) 
  Karayolları Ankara (2012-2014)
  Halkbank (2014-2015)
  Eczacıbaşı (2015)
  Balıkesir B.Şehir Bld (2015-2016)
  İdmanocağı(2016–present)

Awards

National team
2011 FIVB Girls Youth World Championship - 
2012 Women's Junior European Volleyball Championship -

See also
 Turkish women in sports

References

1995 births
Sportspeople from Ankara
Living people
Turkish women's volleyball players